Tungi fort  is a small 16th-century fort probably mainly used as a lookout post in the past. It is situated to the east of Karjat in the Indian state of Maharashtra. It is one of the easy-to-reach forts near the Bhimashanker trek route in the Karjat area.

History

Little history about this fort is known. The locals say that this is not actually a fort but a lookout station from where any movement of troops along the Ganapati Ghat road could be seen.

Access
The base village is Khandas which is 31 km from Karjat. Karjat is well connected by road and railway from Mumbai and Pune.  The starting point for the trek is Khandas village. The path to the south of the village leads to the fort.

See also
List of forts in Maharashtra
 Marathi People
 List of Maratha dynasties and states
 Maratha War of Independence

References 

Buildings and structures of the Maratha Empire
Forts in Raigad district
16th-century forts in India
Tourist attractions in Pune district
Former populated places in India
Hiking trails in India